Rude is a surname. Notable people with the surname include:

Dick Rude (born 1964), writer, actor, and film director
François Rude (1784–1855), French sculptor
George Rudé (1910–1993), British Marxist historian
Gilbert T. Rude (1881–1962), American Coast and Geodetic Survey and Navy officer
Rick Rude (1958–1999), ring name of American wrestler Richard Rood
Steve Rude (born 1956), American comics artist